Events in the year 1902 in Japan.

Incumbents
Emperor: Emperor Meiji
Prime Minister: Katsura Tarō

Governors
Aichi Prefecture: Baron Mori Momura  
Akita Prefecture: Takeda Chiyosaburo then Shiba Sankarasu
Aomori Prefecture: Ichiji Yamanouchi
Ehime Prefecture: Tai Neijro
Fukui Prefecture: Munakata Tadashi then Suke Sakamoto
Fukushima Prefecture: Arita Yoshisuke
Gifu Prefecture: Kawaji Toshikyo
Gunma Prefecture: Nobuchika Ogura 
Hiroshima Prefecture: Asada Tokunori
Ibaraki Prefecture: Chuzo Kono 
Iwate Prefecture: Ganri Hojo 
Kagawa Prefecture: Naokata Suehiro then Motohiro Onoda
Kochi Prefecture: Kinyuu Watanabe 
Kumamoto Prefecture: Tokuhisa Tsunenori then Egi Kazuyuki
Kyoto Prefecture: Baron Shoichi Omori
Mie Prefecture: Kamon Furusha
Miyagi Prefecture: Motohiro Onoda then Tadashi Munakata then Terumi Tanabe
Miyazaki Prefecture: Toda Tsunetaro 
Nagano Prefecture: Oshikawa Sokkichi then Seki Kiyohide  
Niigata Prefecture: Oshikawa Sokkichi then Hiroshi Abe
Oita Prefecture: Marques Okubo Toshi Takeshi  
Okinawa Prefecture: Shigeru Narahara
Osaka Prefecture: Tadashini Kikuchi
Saga Prefecture: Seki Kiyohide then Fai Kagawa
Saitama Prefecture: Marquis Okubo Toshi Takeshi
Shiga Prefecture: Sada Suzuki
Shiname Prefecture: Ihara Ko then Matsunaga Takeyoshi
Tochigi Prefecture: Korechika then Sugai Makoto 
Tokushima Prefecture: Saburo Iwao
Tokyo: Baron Sangay Takatomi
Toyama Prefecture: Higaki Naosuke then Hisashi Ogura then Rika Ryusuke
Yamagata Prefecture: Baron Seki Yoshiomi then Tanaka Takamichi 
Yamanashi Prefecture: Takeda Chiyosaburo

Events
January 23 – The Aomori Infantry, Eighth Division begin their snow march toward the Hakkōda Mountains. 199 soldiers die when a blizzard hits (known as the Snow March to Mt. Hakkoda).
January 30 – The first  was signed in London at Lansdowne House, on 30 January 1902, by Lord Lansdowne (British foreign secretary) and Hayashi Tadasu (Japanese minister in London). A diplomatic milestone that saw an end to Britain's splendid isolation, the alliance was renewed and expanded in scope twice, in 1905 and 1911, before its demise in 1921. It was officially terminated in 1923.
May 1 – Daiwa Securities founded, as  predecessor name was Fujimoto Bill Broker Banking in Kitaiama, Osaka.
August 10 – Japanese general election: The result was a victory for the Rikken Seiyūkai party, which won 191 of the 376 seats. Voting remained restricted to men aged over 25 who paid at least 10 yen a year in direct taxation, although 1900 electoral reforms had reduced the figure from 15 yen, increasing the proportion of the population able to vote from 1% to 2%.
 September 15 – Dai-ichi Life was founded in Kyobashi region, Tokyo.

Births
January 25 – Shigeharu Nakano author and politician (d. 1979)
January 26 – Prince Kachō Hirotada, army lieutenant (d. 1924)
February 17 – Nakamura Ganjirō II, film actor (d. 1983)
April 11 – Hideo Kobayashi, author and writer (d. 1983)
May 24 – Seishi Yokomizo, author (d. 1981)
June 25 – Yasuhito, Prince Chichibu (d. 1953)
September 28 – Kenzo Okada, painter (d. 1982)
October 5 – Kimura Kume, film actor (d. 1989).

Deaths
 July 18 – Saigō Jūdō, politician (Genrō) and admiral (b. 1843)
 August 18 – Nishimura Shigeki, educator (b. 1828)
 September 8 – Nagayo Sensai, doctor, educator and statesman (b. 1838)
 September 19 – Masaoka Shiki, poet, author, and literary critic (b. 1867)
 December 12 – Sano Tsunetami, politician and founder of the Japanese Red Cross Society (b. 1822)
 December 24 – Takayama Chogyū, author and literary critic (b. 1871)

References

 
1900s in Japan
Japan
Years of the 20th century in Japan